SYR1: Anagrama is an EP by American alternative rock band Sonic Youth. It was released in May 1997, and was the first in a series of experimental and mostly instrumental releases issued on the band's own SYR label.

Background 

The liner notes for Anagrama were written in French, starting a tradition of having the liner notes of SYR releases written in foreign languages.

Track listing

Personnel 
Sonic Youth

 Thurston Moore – vocals, guitar 
 Kim Gordon – vocals, bass 
 Lee Ranaldo – vocals, guitar 
 Steve Shelley – drums

Technical
 Wharton Tiers – engineering
 Greg Calbi – mastering

References

External links 

 
 

1997 EPs
Sonic Youth EPs
Post-rock EPs
Experimental rock EPs
Noise rock EPs
Sonic Youth Recordings albums